Cuminetti may refer to:

 Juan Cuminetti (born 1967), Argentine volleyball player
 Silvia Cuminetti (born 1985), Italian ski mountaineer

See also
 Caminetti (disambiguation)